The Third Field Army was one of the five main forces of the Communist Party's People's Liberation Army during the Chinese Civil War. It was established in early 1949. Initially known as the East China Field Army, it was formed by the New Fourth Army and the Eighth Route Army troops stationed in Shandong Province, a gradual adaptation of the expansion.

It took control of the troops in eastern China, with Chen Yi as its commander. It comprised the 7th, 8th, 9th, and 10th Armies plus the headquarters of the special technical troops, with a total of 580,000 men.

Forces associated with the Third Field Army included:
The 7th Army, Commander Wang Jian'an, political commissar Tan Qilong, chief of staff Li Yingxi:
21st Corps (including 61, 62, 63rd Divisions), commander Teng Haiqing, political commissar Kang Zhiqiang
22nd Corps (including the 64th, 65th, 66th Divisions), commander Sun Jixian, political commissar Ding Qiusheng
23rd Corps (including 67th, 68th, 69th Divisions), commander Tao Yong, political commissar Lu Sheng
35th Corps (including 103, 104, 105th Divisions), commander Wu Huawen, political commissar He Kexi
The 8th Army, Commander Chen Shiju, political commissar Yuan Zhongxian, chief of staff He Yixiang
24th Corps (including the 70, 71, 72 Divisions), commander Wang Bicheng, political commissar Liao Haiguang
25th Corps (including the 73rd, 74th and 75th divisions), commander Cheng Jun, political commissar Huang Huoxing
26th Corps (including 76, 77, 78th Divisions), commander Zhang Renchu, political commissar Wang Yiping
34th Corps (including the first 100, 101, 102 Divisions), commander He Jifeng, political commissar Zhao Qimin
The 9th Army, Commander Song Shilun, political commissar Guo Huaruo, chief of staff Qin Jian
20th Corps (including 58, 59, 60th Divisions), commander Liu Fei, political commissar Chen Shifu
27th Corps (including the 79, 80, 81 divisions), commander Nie Fengzhi, political commissar Liu Haotian
30th Army(including 88, 89, 90th Divisions), commander Xie Zhenhua, political commissar Li Ganhui
33rd Army (including the 97th, 98th, 99th Divisions), commander Zhang Kexia, political commissar Han Nianlong
The 10th Army, Commander Ye Fei, political commissar Wei Guoqing, Chief of Staff Chen Qingxian 
28th Corps (including the 82nd, 83rd, 84th Divisions), commander Zhu Shaoqing
29th Corps (including 85, 86, 87th Divisions), commander Hu Bingyun, political commissar Zhang Fan
31st Corps (including 91st, 92, 93rd Divisions), commander Zhou Zhijian, political commissar Chen Huatang
Directly under the jurisdiction of Third Field Army
32nd Corps (including the 94th Division, 95th Division), commander Tan Xilin, political commissar Peng Lin
Special forces column, commander Chen Ruiting, political commissar Zhang Kai
Guangdong-Guangxi Column (March 1947 - March 1949), commander Zeng Sheng, political commissar Lei Jingtian

In August 1950 the force was redesignated the East China Military Region.

References

External links
https://www.cia.gov/readingroom/docs/CIA-RDP82-00457R006400280009-6.pdf - dispositions of the Third Field Army, October 1950

Field armies of the People's Liberation Army
Military units and formations established in 1949